Instant-boiled mutton is a Chinese hot pot dish.

Introduction

Instant-boiled mutton, also known as Mongolian Fire Pot or dip-boil mutton, is a Chinese hot pot dish. Traditionally, Chinese people have eaten it inside the home during cold winter weather, but in recent times, instant-boiled mutton has been eaten year-round. It is also eaten in restaurants.

Mutton slice often uses different cut from the back (e.g. shangnao, sancha, etc.) and rear legs (e.g. modang). The tail of the lamb is used to prepare the soup base.

History
Instant-boiled mutton dates back to the Yuan Dynasty. At one point during a battle, the Khagan of the Mongol Empire, Kublai Khan, had a sudden craving for stewed mutton. However, the enemy's troops were approaching. To satisfy Kublai Khan's desire, a chef quickly cut off a dozen thin mutton slices and put them in boiling water. He removed them as soon as the lamb changed color and put them into a bowl with salt. Kublai Khan finished the mutton quickly and returned to the battle, which he won. At the victory banquet, Kublai Khan requested that the chef make this lamb dish again and named it instant-boiled mutton.

Cooking and eating method
When instant-boiled mutton is eaten in China, a hot-pot of boiling water is placed in the middle of the table.  Tofu, Chinese cabbage, bean sprouts, and vermicelli are normally included in the hot-pot. Lamb is pre-sliced paper-thin into unbroken pieces and served on the table. Eaters pick up some pre-sliced raw lamb using chopsticks, put it in the boiling hot-pot, and remove it as soon as the lamb changes color. Each person has a small bowl to hold sauce for the cooked lamb; the sauce is normally a mixture of sesame sauce, chili oil, leeks, and more.

See also
 List of lamb dishes

References 
 Zhongli, Tumei. (2007). Food in China. Beijing: China Intercontinental Press. .

External links
 www.china.org.cn
 www.chinesefoodrecipes.org
 Lamb:Good for you
 China Eating Out Guide

Beijing cuisine
Lamb dishes
Chinese soups and stews